Southeastern Baptist College is a private Baptist Bible college in Laurel, Mississippi. Founded in 1948, it offers both a 4-year Bachelor's degree program and a 2-year curriculum. The college is accredited at the state level by the Mississippi Commission on Accreditation and by the Association For Biblical Higher Education (ABHE) on the national level.

Academics
Southeastern offers Associate of Arts degrees in Bible, Business, and General Education and a Bachelor of Science degrees in Church Ministries and Business. All liberal arts courses are taught by qualified faculty from a Christian Worldview perspective.

Southeastern has many graduates continue on to such seminaries as the Baptist Missionary Association Theological Seminary in Jacksonville, Texas, Southwestern Baptist Theological Seminary in Fort Worth, Texas, Liberty University and Seminary in Lynchburg, Virginia, Temple Baptist Seminary in Chattanooga, Tennessee, Reformed Theological Seminary in Jackson, New Orleans Baptist Theological Seminary, Mid-America Baptist Theological Seminary in Memphis, Tennessee, as well as locally, William Carey University in Hattiesburg, Mississippi.

Campus
The campus is located on  containing nine buildings on Hwy. 15 N just outside Laurel, MS in the Shady Grove community. Laurel is just a short drive from Hattiesburg, Meridian, and Jackson, Mississippi.

Affiliation
Southeastern Baptist College is owned and operated by the Baptist Missionary Association of the state of Mississippi and governed by a board of trustees elected annually by the association.

External links
Official website

Educational institutions established in 1948
Baptist universities and colleges in the United States
Seminaries and theological colleges in Mississippi
Bible colleges
Universities and colleges affiliated with the Southern Baptist Convention
Schools in Jones County, Mississippi
1948 establishments in Mississippi